Rada Lysenko (10 July 1921 – 11 January 2021) was a Ukrainian pianist, pedagogue, People's Artist of Ukraine recipient, and granddaughter of Mykola Lysenko.

Career
She graduated from the Kiev Conservatory after the war where Abram Lufer was her teacher. During the Second World War she was relocated to Germany from where she immigrated to Lviv. Later on, she was granted a residence in Moscow where she performed her popular concert called Vitry buini. She served on the jury at the International Music Competition since 1962 and at the age of 91 still performed and gave lessons at the same conservatory.

References

External links
 

1921 births
2021 deaths
Ukrainian pianists
Ukrainian women pianists
20th-century pianists
21st-century pianists
Piano pedagogues
Recipients of the title of People's Artists of Ukraine
Women music educators
Soviet pianists
Recipients of the title of Merited Artist of Ukraine
20th-century women pianists
21st-century women pianists